Derek Prag (6 August 1923 – 20 January 2010) was a British Member of the European Parliament for Hertfordshire from 1979 to 1994. He represented the European People's Party.

Prag was born in Merthyr Tydfil, Glamorgan, Wales and attended Bolton School in Lancashire from 1934 to 1941 then read Modern Languages at Emmanuel College, Cambridge. He had a career in journalism before going to work for the European Union. In 1948 he married Dora, with whom he was joint patron of the European Union Youth Orchestra. He had three sons: Nicholas, Stephen and Jonathan.

Previously Prag had been the first head of the European Commission office in London, and for many years he was chairman of the London Europe Society. He served on the board of EUbusiness, a business information service about the European Union.

Derek Prag died in January 2010 from a heart attack, aged 86.

References

External links
Homepage at the European Parliament

1923 births
2010 deaths
People educated at Bolton School
Alumni of Emmanuel College, Cambridge
Conservative Party (UK) MEPs
MEPs for England 1979–1984
MEPs for England 1984–1989
MEPs for England 1989–1994